The Breakthrough is the seventh studio album by American singer Mary J. Blige, released on December 20, 2005, by Geffen Records. Blige recorded the album with a host of songwriters and record producers, including 9th Wonder, Rodney Jerkins, Jimmy Jam and Terry Lewis, Bryan-Michael Cox, J.U.S.T.I.C.E. League, Raphael Saadiq, Chucky Thompson, Cool & Dre, Ron Fair, and will.i.am.

The Breakthrough received positive reviews from most critics and debuted at number one on the Billboard 200. It has been certified triple platinum by the Recording Industry Association of America (RIAA), and has sold 3,100,000 copies in the United States.

Release and promotion 
Mary J. Blige embarked on several live performances and appearances to promote the release of The Breakthrough. Blige performed with rapper The Game during his performance of "Hate It or Love It" at the BET Awards on June 28, 2005. Blige sung a medley of "You're All I Need to Get By" with Method Man, "I'm Goin' Down", "Real Love", and "Can't Hide from Luv" on BET's 25 Strong: The BET Silver Anniversary Special in October 2005. In November 2005, Blige was honored with the V LEGEND AWARD at 2005 Vibe Awards. On December 21, 2005, Blige was interviewed and performed on The Tyra Banks Show, singing a rendition of "Can't Hide from Luv". Blige sung a medley of "Family Affair", "Can't Hide from Luv", and "Be Without You" on New Year's Eve with Carson Daly on December 31, 2005. On February 8, 2006, Blige performed "One" with U2 at the 48th Annual Grammy Awards. Blige performed "Be Without You" and "Enough Cryin" on Saturday Night Live in April 2006. Blige sung a medley of "Be Without You" and "Enough Cryin" at the 2006 BET Awards, where she won two awards for 
Best Female R&B Artist and Video of the Year on June 27, 2006. Blige embarked on The Breakthrough Experience Tour from July 14, 2006, to September 10, 2006. Letoya Luckett and Jaheim were opening acts during the tour. On December 4, 2006, Blige performed "Enough Cryin" and "Take Me as I Am" at the 2006 Billboard Music Awards, where she won nine awards. At the 49th Annual Grammy Awards, on February 11, 2007, Blige performed "Be Without You". She won three awards during the ceremony.

Reception

Commercial performance 
The album debuted at number one on both the US Billboard 200 and Top R&B/Hip-Hop Albums. Selling 727,000 copies in its first week, it became the biggest first-week sales for an R&B solo female artist in SoundScan history, the fifth largest first-week sales for a female artist, and the fourth largest debut of 2005. It has been certified triple platinum by the Recording Industry Association of America (RIAA). As of 2009, The Breakthrough has sold 3,100,000 copies in the United States.

Critical response 

The Breakthrough was met with generally positive reviews. At Metacritic, which assigns a normalized rating out of 100 to reviews from professional publications, the album received an average score of 76, based on 20 reviews. Andy Gill of The Independent deemed it perhaps "her best, the most vivid realisation of her gripping, confessional style". David Browne believed The Breakthrough marked a return for Blige to her dramatic strengths, writing in Entertainment Weekly that the music's "messy sprawl of conflicted emotions feels true to her fierce, prickly personality (not to mention life itself)". In The New York Times, Jon Pareles credited the singer for bringing together "hip-hop realism and soul's higher aspirations, hip-hop's digitized crispness and soul's slow-building testimonies". Stylus Magazines Thomas Inskeep viewed it as a "return to form" for Blige, calling it her "finest full-length since '99's Mary", while Rolling Stone journalist Barry Walters said that unlike with her previous albums, The Breakthroughs ballads genuinely stand out. Andy Kellman from AllMusic said each song proved Blige had been given her "best round of productions" since the mid 1990s. Los Angeles Times critic Natalie Nichols credited the producers for "adeptly weaving beats and live instruments, vocals and rapping, melody and rhythm in configurations alternately stark and lush".

Jason King was less impressed in The Village Voice, feeling that The Breakthrough had improved on Blige's 2003 album Love & Life but still lacked the creativity of 1999's Mary. Blige's penchant for "hermetic, clinically slick production values doesn't complement her soul-baring aura", King wrote. Spin journalist Tom Breihan felt the production's "awkwardly programmed drums and cluttered synthetic arrangements" generally failed to give her a conducive space for an effective performance and left "the songs' chin-up aphorisms ringing false". Slant Magazines Sal Cinquemani was more critical of the lyrics, finding them distastefully sentimental, unsubtle, and "the epitome of formulaic, giving you the feeling that you've heard this all before".

Accolades 
At the 2006 American Music Awards, Blige won two awards for Favorite Soul/R&B Album and Favorite Soul/R&B Artist.
Blige won Best R&B Video for "Be Without You" at the MTV Video Music Awards.
Blige won two awards at the BET Awards for Best Female R&B Artist and Video of the Year.
Blige won nine Billboard Music Awards, including R&B/Hip-Hop Album of the Year, R&B/Hip-Hop Song of the Year, R&B/Hip-Hop Albums Artist of the Year, R&B/Hip-Hop Songs Artist of the Year, R&B/Hip-Hop Artist of the Year and Female Artist of the Year.
In 2007, Blige received eight nominations at the 49th Annual Grammy Awards, the most of any artist for that ceremony. "Be Without You" was nominated for both Record of the Year and Song of the Year categories; it won for Best Female R&B Vocal Performance and Best R&B Song, while The Breakthrough won in the category of Best R&B Album.
At the 2007 NAACP Image Awards, Blige won 2 awards, Outstanding Music Video for "Be Without You" and Outstanding Female Artist.

Track listing

Notes
  signifies a vocal producer
  signifies an additional producer
  signifies an additional vocal producer
  signifies a co-producer

Sample credits
 "No One Will Do" contains excerpts from "I Swear I Love No One but You", written by Bunny Sigler and performed by the O'Jays.
 "About You" contains samples from "Feeling Good", written by Anthony Newley and Leslie Bricusse and performed by Nina Simone.
 "Gonna Breakthrough" contains samples from "The Champ", written by Harry Palmer and performed by the Mohawks.
 "Good Woman Down" contains excerpts from "Heart Breaking Decision", written by Robert Aries, Freddie Jackson and Meli'sa Morgan and performed by Morgan.
 "Take Me as I Am" contains samples from "A Garden of Peace", written and performed by Lonnie Liston Smith.
 "Can't Hide from Luv" contains excerpts and a sample of "I Wanna Be Where You Are", written by Arthur Ross and Leon Ware and performed by Michael Jackson.
 "MJB da MVP" contains excerpts from "Rubberband", written by Ron Baker, Allen Felder and Norman Harris and performed by the Tramps. It also contains resung lyrics from "All Night Long", written by James Johnson, "Remind Me", written by Patrice Rushen and Karen Evans, and "Everybody Loves the Sunshine", written by Roy Ayers.

Personnel
Credits for The Breakthrough adapted from AllMusic.

 50 Cent – Vocals
 Chalmers Alford – Guitar
 Johnta Austin – Vocal Producer
 Bobby Ross Avila – Guitar, Keyboards, Producer, Strings
 Issiah "IZ" Avila – Bass, Drums, Percussion, Producer
 Robert Bacon – Guitar
 Charlie Bisharat – String Instrument
 Mary J. Blige – Producer, Vocal Arrangement, Vocal Producer, Vocals
 Bono – Guitar, Vocals
 Jacqueline Brand – String Instrument, Violin
 Craig Brockman – Piano
 Charles "Biscuits" Brungardt – Vocal Producer
 Roberto Cani – String Instrument, Violin
 Lily Chen – String Instrument, Violin
 Danny Cheung "Stems" – Engineer
 Candice Childress – Production Coordination
 Adam Clayton – Guitar (Bass)
 Larry Corbett – Cello, String Instrument
 Bryan-Michael Cox – Instrumentation, Producer, String Arrangements
 Vidal Davis – Instrumentation, Producer
 Loren Dawson – Piano
 Mario Diaz de Leon – String Instrument, Violin
 Brian Dembow – String Instrument, Viola
 Joel Deroin – String Instrument
 Patrick Dillett – Engineer, Vocal Producer
 Reginald Dozier – Engineer
 Andrew Duckles – String Instrument, Viola
 Bruce Dukov – Violin
 The Edge – Guitar
 Michael Eleopoulos – Assistant Engineer, Engineer
 Stephen Erdody – Cello, String Instrument
 Anthony "Devyne" Evans – Engineer
 Anthony Lavon Evans – Engineer
 Ron Fair – Conductor, Guitar, Harmonica, Keyboards, Orchestra Bells, Organ, Piano, Producer, String Arrangements, Vocal Arrangement, Vocal Producer
 Jan Fairchild – Engineer
 AMarlow Fisher – String Instrument, Viola
 Drew FitzGerald – Art Direction
 Paul Foley – Engineer
 Samuel Formicola – String Instrument, Viola
 Matt Funes – String Instrument
 Sean Garrett – Vocal Producer
 Endre Genet – String Instrument
 Julie Gigante – String Instrument, Violin
 Carl Glanville – Original Recordings
 Larry Gold – String Arrangements
 John Goux – Guitar (Acoustic), Guitar (Electric)
 Alicia Graham – A&R
 Endre Granat – Violin
 Bernie Grundman – Mastering
 Alan Grunfeld – String Instrument
 Rexsell Hardy, Jr. – Drums
 Andre Harris – Instrumentation, Producer
 Keith Harris – Keyboards, Organ, Piano, Synthesizer Bass
 Clayton Haslop – String Instrument, Violin
 Tal Herzberg – Digital Editing, Engineer, Producer
 Keri Hilson – Vocal Arrangement
 Paula Hochhalter – Cello, String Instrument, Strings
 Infinity – Producer
 Kendu Isaacs – Management, Mixing
 Jun Ishizeki – Assistant Engineer
 Jake & the Phatman – Producer
 Jimmy Jam – Producer
 Jaycen Joshua – Assistant Engineer, Engineer, Mixing
 Rodney Jerkins – Mixing, Producer
 Jahaun Johnson – A&R
 Justice League – Producer
 Suzie Katayama – Cello, String Instrument
 Bernard Kenny – Bass
 Kimberly Kimble – Hair Stylist
 Markus Klinko & Indrani – Photography
 Armen Ksadjikian – Cello, String Instrument
 Songa Lee – String Instrument, Violin
 Natalie Leggett – String Instrument, Violin
 Phillipe Levy – String Instrument, Violin
 Terry Lewis – Producer
 Andrea Liberman – Stylist
 David Low – String Instrument
 David Lowery – String Instrument
 Rene Mandel – Violin
 Matt Marrin – Engineer
 Tony Maserati – Mixing
 Harvey Mason, Sr. – Glockenspiel, Tympani [Timpani]
 Darrin McCann – String Instrument, Viola
 Davel "Bo" McKenzie – Producer
 Cornelius Mims – Bass
 Vicki Miskolczy – Viola
 Peter Mokran – Mixing
 Wesley Morrow – Production Coordination
 Larry Mullen, Jr. – Drums, Percussion
 Dean Nelson – Assistant, Mixing
 9th Wonder – Producer
 Robin Olson – Violin
 Robert Ozuna – Drums, Percussion, Scratching
 Sid Page – String Instrument, Violin
 Alyssa Park – String Instrument, Violin
 Dave Pensado – Mixing
 Katia Popov – Violin
 Jack Joseph Puig – Mixing
 Frank Romano – Guitar
 Mark Robertson – Violin
 Mally Roncal – Make-Up
 Anatoly Rosinsky – Violin
 Raphael Saadiq – Bass, Guitar, Producer
 Allen Sides – Engineer
 The South Central Chamber Orchestra – Strings
 South Central Orchestra – Strings
 Tereza Stanislav – String Instrument
 Supa Engineer "Dura" – Mixing
 John Tanksley – Assistant Engineer, Engineer
 Troy Taylor – Vocal Producer
 Cecilia Tsan – Cello
 Charles Vail – Strings
 Josephina Vergara – String Instrument, Violin
 will.i.am – Engineer, Keyboards
 Kelvin Wooten – Keyboards
 Benjamin Wright – String Arrangements, String Conductor, String Writing
 James "Big Jim" Wright – Keyboards, Producer
 Dave Young – Performer
 Dave Young Orchestra – Vocal Producer

Charts

Weekly charts

Year-end charts

Certifications

See also
 List of Billboard 200 number-one albums of 2006
 List of Billboard number-one R&B albums of 2006

References

External links
 

2005 albums
Albums produced by 9th Wonder
Albums produced by Bryan-Michael Cox
Albums produced by Cool & Dre
Albums produced by D'Mile
Albums produced by Dre & Vidal
Albums produced by Jimmy Jam and Terry Lewis
Albums produced by J.U.S.T.I.C.E. League
Albums produced by Raphael Saadiq
Albums produced by Rich Harrison
Albums produced by Rodney Jerkins
Albums produced by Ron Fair
Albums produced by will.i.am
Geffen Records albums
Grammy Award for Best R&B Album
Mary J. Blige albums
Interscope Geffen A&M Records albums